VEDIC UNIVERSITY : These special Universities are meant for spreading the knowledge of Sanskrit and Vedas / Vedic Sciences. Such Universities are concerned with Vedic Hinduism.

There are several institutions that contain the phrase Vedic University:

 Maharishi Mahesh Yogi Vedic University in Katni, Madhya Pradesh, India
 International Vedic Hindu University